The 1913 East Antrim by-election was held on 19 February 1913.  The by-election was held due to the death of the incumbent Irish Unionist MP, James McCalmont.  It was won by the Irish Unionist candidate Robert McCalmont, who was unopposed.

Result

References

External links 
A Vision Of Britain Through Time

1913 elections in Ireland
1913 elections in the United Kingdom
By-elections to the Parliament of the United Kingdom in County Antrim constituencies
Unopposed by-elections to the Parliament of the United Kingdom in Irish constituencies
20th century in County Antrim